The Bajaj Kawasaki Caliber was a motorcycle developed and sold by Kawasaki and Bajaj in India from 1998 to 2006. It was made by incorporating some improvements in the Bajaj 4S. One of the changes was the addition of an oil filter. The Caliber had a  engine.

Caliber
Motorcycles introduced in 1998